General (abbreviated as Gen.) is the highest attainable and full general rank of the Sri Lankan Army and was created as a direct equivalent of the British military rank of general; it is also considered a four-star rank.

The rank of full general is not always given; this rank is held by a Chief of the Defence Staff (if the chief is appointed from the army and not from the navy or the air force) or is mostly awarded as a ceremonial rank to the Commander of the Army on his day of retirement.

General is a higher rank than lieutenant general, but is lower than field marshal. General is the equivalent of Admiral in the Sri Lanka Navy and Air Chief Marshal in the Sri Lanka Air Force.

History
When the Ceylon Army was formed the rank of general was the highest rank defined under the Army Act of 1949. Since the formation the British Army officer heading the army held the rank of brigadier and the first Ceylonese officer to command the army, Anton Muttukumaru was promoted to the rank of major general in 1958.

In 1974, then commander of the army, Sepala Attygalle was promoted to the rank of lieutenant general and ever since then all serving commanders of the army held the rank of lieutenant general, customarily promoted to the rank on appointment to the post of commander of the army.

Sepala Attygalle became the first officer to be promoted to the rank of general on his retirement from the army on 13 October 1977. Former Prime Minister of Ceylon, Sir John Kotelawala was appointed to the honorary rank of general of the Volunteer Force in 1980. In 1988, Cyril Ranatunga became the first regular officer to be promoted to the rank of general, without serving as the commander of the army until Kamal Gunaratne was promoted in 2020. In 1991, Ranjan Wijeratne was the only person appointed to the rank posthumously. Since 1991, it became customary for all commanders of the army to be promoted to the rank of general on the final day of service if they were retiring or appointed as Chief of the Defence Staff. In 2007, two former commanders of the army were also promoted to the rank of general. In 2009, Sarath Fonseka became the first officer to hold the rank of general, while serving as commander of the army for a brief period. In 2015, the higher ceremonial rank of field marshal was created. General remains the highest rank under the Army Act and is the highest pay grade in the army. In 2020, Shavendra Silva was promoted to the rank while concurrently serving as both commander of the army and chief of the defence staff.

Notable full generals
Rohan Daluwatte
Jagath Jayasuriya

General of the Volunteer Force
Three former members of the volunteer force have been awarded the honorary rank of General of the Volunteer Force  of the Army. 
 General Sir John Kotelawala (1980) — Former Prime Minister of Ceylon and Minister of Defense and External Affairs.
 General Ranjan Wijeratne (1991 - posthumously) — Minister of Foreign Affairs and Minister of State for Defence.
 General Anuruddha Ratwatte (1995) — Minister of Power and Energy and Deputy Minister for Defence

Insignia 
A general officer's insignia is a crossed sword and baton.  A Major-General has a pip over this emblem; a Lieutenant-General a Sri Lanka emblem instead of a pip; and a full General both a pip and the Sri Lanka emblem. The Gorget patches of the General officer pattern, gold/silver oak leaf chain of two oak leave, four gold/silver stars on scarlet background with a gold/silver button; worn on Dress No 2A, 4, 5, 5A, 6, 6A, 6B, 7 and 8. The Gorget patches of the General Officers Large/Medium patterns, of gold braided (bullion wire) three oak leaves on scarlet background with a gold button, worn by the officers in the rank of major general and above for Dress No1, No 3 and 3A.

References

Army, Sri Lanka. (1st Edition - October 1999). "50 YEARS ON" - 1949-1999, Sri Lanka Army.

External links 
Sri Lanka Army
Ministry of Defence - Democratic Socialist Republic of Sri Lanka
Three Service Commanders promoted : Official Government News Portal 

Military ranks of the Sri Lanka Army